The 1906 Iowa gubernatorial election was held on November 6, 1906. Incumbent Republican Albert B. Cummins defeated Democratic nominee Claude R. Porter with 50.18% of the vote.

General election

Candidates
Major party candidates
Albert B. Cummins, Republican
Claude R. Porter, Democratic 

Other candidates
Lorenzo S. Coffin, Prohibition
John E. Shank, Socialist
J. R. Norman, People's
Andrew Townsend Hisey, Independent

Results

References

1906
Iowa
Gubernatorial